John Henry Scammell (July 11, 1894 – September 18, 1940) was an educator, journalist and political figure in the Dominion of Newfoundland. He represented St. Barbe from 1919 to 1928 and Bonavista Centre from 1928 to 1932 in the Newfoundland and Labrador House of Assembly.

He was born in Change Islands, Colony of Newfoundland, the son of Arthur Scammell and Althea Jones, and was educated there, at Bishop Feild College and at the teacher's summer school in St. John's. Scammell was principal of the Boys' Central Training School in St. John's and taught at Bishop Feild College. In 1916, he became private secretary to William Coaker. He succeeded Coaker as president of the Fishermen's Protective Union in 1926, serving in that position until 1936. In 1929, Scammell became the editor of the Fishermen's Advocate. He died of a stroke at a hospital in Bonavista at the age of 46 and was buried in Change Islands.

References 
 

Fishermen's Protective Union MHAs
1894 births
1940 deaths
Bishop Feild School alumni
Dominion of Newfoundland people